The Volvo LV60-series was a light truck produced by Swedish automaker Volvo between 1929 and 1932.

History
Volvo soon realized that the company's first four-cylinder side-valve engine simply wasn’t powerful enough so the company brought out a more powerful six-cylinder engine for its automobiles and trucks. The new LV60 truck was introduced in the summer of 1929. Apart from the larger engine and a four speed gear box it was identical to its predecessor, the LV Series 2.

Engines

Gallery

References

External links 

 Volvo Trucks Global - history
 Swedish brass cars - picture gallery
 Volvo Trucks Databank 

LV60
Vehicles introduced in 1929